Chastin Jareaux West (born May 1, 1987 in Inglewood, California) is a former American football wide receiver.  He was signed by the Green Bay Packers of the National Football League as an undrafted free agent in 2010. He was a part of the Packers' Super Bowl XLV championship team that beat the Pittsburgh Steelers. He played college football for Fresno State. He has also played for the Jacksonville Jaguars.

College career 
West was an all-purpose back his freshman season, recording at least ten rushes, receptions and kick returns. After not playing sophomore year, West returned as a junior still catching the ball and returning kicks, but not rushing the ball. Senior year, he took over punt returns but did not return kicks. Still, senior year was West's most productive year, finishing seventh in the Western Athletic Conference with 15.7 yards per catch. West totaled 81 receptions for 1051 yards and 45 kick returns for 958 yards while playing for Fresno State University.

Professional career

Green Bay Packers
After going undrafted in the 2010 NFL Draft, West signed with the Green Bay Packers on April 30, 2010. He earned a Super Bowl ring as a Practice squad member. He was cut by the Packers on September 3, 2011. Afterwards, West was signed to the Packers' practice squad the next day.

Jacksonville Jaguars
West was signed from the Packers practice squad by the Jacksonville Jaguars on September 20, 2011. He was released on August 25, 2012.

Detroit Lions
West signed a futures contract with the Detroit Lions on January 1, 2013.

References

External links

Jacksonville Jaguars players
Detroit Lions players
American football wide receivers
Fresno State Bulldogs football players
1987 births
Living people
Players of American football from Inglewood, California
Green Bay Packers players
Sportspeople from Ventura County, California